The Italian Peninsula (Italian: penisola italica or penisola italiana), also known as the Italic Peninsula or the Apennine Peninsula, is a peninsula extending from the southern Alps in the north to the central Mediterranean Sea in the south. It is nicknamed lo Stivale (the Boot). Three smaller peninsulas contribute to this characteristic shape, namely Calabria (the "toe"), Salento (the "heel") and Gargano (the "spur"). The backbone of the Italian Peninsula consists of the Apennine Mountains, from which it takes one of its names. The peninsula comprises much of Italy, and also includes the microstates of San Marino and Vatican City.

Characteristics

Minimum extent

In general discourse, "Italy" and "Italian peninsula" are often used as synonymous terms. However, the Po Valley may be excluded from the Italian peninsula. In this sense, the Italian peninsula includes only about 44% of Italy's total area. On the other hand, Sicily and other smaller islands off the peninsula may be geographically grouped along with it.

Geographically, the minimum extent of the Italian Peninsula consists of the land south of a line extending from the Magra to the Rubicon rivers, north of the Tuscan–Emilian  Apennines. It excludes the Po Valley and the southern slopes of the Alps. The Italian Peninsula has the only active volcano in mainland Europe, Mount Vesuvius.

All of these territories lie within the  Italian Republic except for the microstates of San Marino and Vatican City:

Climate

The peninsula lies between the Tyrrhenian Sea on the west, the Ionian Sea on the south, and the Adriatic Sea on the east.

The peninsula has mainly a Mediterranean climate, though in the mountainous parts the climate is much cooler. Its natural vegetation includes macchia along the coasts and deciduous and mixed deciduous coniferous forests in the interior.

See also
 Apennine Mountains
 Southern Europe
 History of Italy
 Roman Republic
 Roman Italy
 Insular Italy

References

External links
 

Peninsulas of Europe
Geography of Southern Europe
Regions of Europe
Regions of Eurasia
Metropolitan or continental parts of states